Siri Willow Ceridwen Neal (born 14 August 1972, sometimes credited as Siri O'Neal) is a film and television actress.

Career
Neal's grandmother's surname was O'Neal; although her mother altered it to "Neal", from 1996 Neal has also used "O'Neal".
She is best known for appearing as Minty, the lead role in Moondial (1988), dramatic children's television series originally aired on the BBC.

Neal also appeared as Juanita, a guerilla leader/French double agent, in the television film Sharpe's Battle (1995), a part of the multi-part drama series Sharpe. She also guest starred in two episodes of the TV drama Lovejoy: "Highland Fling Part 1" and "Highland Fling Part 2".

Her last credited role was as a social worker in the film Urban Ghost Story (1998).

Since then, Neal has worked on various audiobooks including the Doctor Who spin off UNIT (2004) alongside David Tennant.

Neal has also provided TV/radio voiceovers for Argos, Clover, Nescafe, Powergen, Sainsburys, Channel 4, Jazz FM & Homelessness.

Filmography

Film

Television

Theatre

Audiobooks

References

External links

 Siri Neal Actor CV
 Moondial Little Gems Fan Page

Living people
British child actresses
British film actresses
British television actresses
1972 births